In Egyptian mythology, Hemsut (or Hemuset) was the goddess of fate and protection. She is representative of the ka.  Her headdress bears a shield, above which are two crossed arrows.

In popular culture
Hemsut is briefly mentioned in The Prince of Egypt.

References

Egyptian goddesses
Time and fate goddesses

ca:Llista de personatges de la mitologia egípcia#H